The Euro-Asia Division (ESD) of Seventh-day Adventists is a sub-entity of the General Conference of Seventh-day Adventists, which oversees the Church's work in the nations of Afghanistan, Armenia, Azerbaijan, Belarus, Georgia, Kazakhstan, Kyrgyzstan, Moldova, Russia, Tajikistan, Turkmenistan and Uzbekistan. Founded in 1990, its headquarters is in Moscow, Russia. The Division membership as of June 30, 2021 is 102,829.

Sub Fields

The Euro-Asia Division is divided into one Union Conferences, four Union Missions, two Union of Churches Conferences, one Union of Churches Mission, four attached Fields and one attached Mission. These are divided into local Conferences and Missions.

Belarus Union of Churches Conference 
 Caucasus Union Mission 
 Kubano-Chernomorskaya Conference
 North Caucasus Mission
 Rostov-Kalmykia Conference
 East Russian Union Mission 
 Central Siberian Mission 
 East Siberian Mission 
 West Siberian Mission 
Far Eastern Union of Churches Mission
 Moldova Union of Churches Conference 
 Southern Union Mission 
 Kazakhstan Mission
 Kyrgyzstan Mission 
 Tajikistan Mission 
 Turkmenistan Field 
 Uzbekistan Mission
 West Russian Union Conference 
 Central Conference 
 Moscow Conference 
 Northwestern Conference 
 Southern Conference 
 Ural Conference 
 Volga Conference 
 Volgo-Vyatskaya Conference
 Armenian Field
 Azerbaijan Field
 Crimea Mission
 Don Field
 Georgian Field

History

See also
Seventh-day Adventist Church
List of Seventh-day Adventist hospitals
List of Seventh-day Adventist secondary schools
List of Seventh-day Adventist colleges and universities

References

Adventist organizations established in the 20th century
Seventh-day Adventist Church in Europe
Seventh-day Adventist Church in Asia